Kristian Widmer (born October 26, 1967) is a Swiss entrepreneur, film producer and TV-producer.

Biography 

Widmer holds a law degree from the University of Zurich and an MBA from the University of St. Gallen HSG. Widmer started working in the film business as an editor. Originally with Vega Film, he joined Condor Films, one of Europe's biggest and oldest film production companies (founded in 1947) in 1994. For Condor Entertainment and Condor Commercials, divisions of the Academy Award-winning company, Kristian Widmer worked as a location manager and production manager on numerous films in Europe, USA, Australia and South America. 2001 he produced Building the Gherkin, an award-winning documentary. In 2003 he produced the feature film Three Against Troy for German TV-broadcaster ZDF. In 2004 he co-produced the movie The Ring Thing.

In 1999 Widmer joined the managing board of Condor Films. In 2003 he became CEO (Chief Executive Officer) of Condor Films, and in 2008 he was appointed President of Condor Films. Widmer is a Member of the Swiss Film Academy. From 2002 to 2006 he was a member of the board of Filmlocation Switzerland and since 2006 has been a member of the board of the Swiss Film Association SFA. In 2010 a group of independent journalists selected Kristian Widmer as one of the 200 most important people in Zurich.

External links 
 Infos about Kristian Widmer at the Condor Films Webpage
 Kristian Widmer about film and video: Videothink

References 

1967 births
Living people
Swiss film producers
University of St. Gallen alumni